Redeemer's University is a private university in  Ede, Osun, off Ibadan-Oshogbo Road, Osun State, Nigeria. Established in 2005, the university is owned by the Redeemed Christian Church of God.

History and governance

The university was founded by Redeemed Christian Church of God in 2005. Headed by the General Overseer, Pastor Enoch Adeboye, a PhD holder in applied mathematics.

The Federal Government of Nigeria granted an operating license to the Redeemer's University on 7 January 2005. In order to realize its dream, the Redeemed Christian Church of God, the Proprietors of the university, initially acquired a large expanse of land in Ede, Osun state, having obtained the Certificate of Statutory Right of Occupancy in 1997.

The university took off at the temporary site in the Redemption Camp on 11 October 2005 with 478 students admitted into three colleges. On 1 February 2006, 473 students matriculated into the colleges to pursue bachelor's degrees in various programmes, and the university has produced 13 sets of graduates.

Vice-chancellors

Below is the list of vice-chancellors, from inception:

Developments and achievements
 In 2013, the university won a World Bank Grant to fund the establishment of the African Centre of Excellence for Genomics of Infectious Diseases (ACEGID).

African Centre of Excellence for Genomics of Infectious Diseases (ACEGID)

In 2013, the university won a World Bank Grant to fund the establishment of the African Centre of Excellence for Genomics of Infectious Diseases (ACEGID). To win the grant, Redeemer's University entered a competition with 15 prestigious universities selected from West and Central Africa and after a rigorous exercise and based on the quality of work exhibited in her proposal, the university was awarded the grant which gave birth to the centre.

It is a World Bank funded collaborative research center. The partners are West African academic and medical institutions (Redeemer's University, University of Ibadan, Irrua Specialist Teaching Hospital in Nigeria, University of Sierra Leone, Kenema Government Hospital in Sierra Leone and Universite Cheik Anta-Diop de Dakar). ACEGID has a mandate to build capacity in the field of genomics in young African scientists and use identify and characterize pathogens of unknown origin using microbial metagenomics. Ultimately, the project aims to translate the research outcome to products that can be deployed to the field in order to contribute to the control, manage and eliminate infectious diseases in the African continent.

Some achievements of ACEGID
 Accurate diagnosis of the first case of Ebola in Sierra Leone and Nigeria in the 2014 EVD outbreak
 Sequenced approximately 250 Ebola virus genomes and made available in open access databank
 Provided tools and training for disease diagnosis, sequencing and bioinformatics
 Developed the capacity and provide facilities to study a BL4 pathogen in rural field settings (Nigeria and Sierra Leone)
 Developed Ebola virus rapid diagnostics test (RDT) for rapid diagnosis of the disease in 10mins
 Developed and a new pan – Lassa fever rapid diagnostics test kit for diagnosis of the disease in 10mins.
 Discovered 2 novel highly divergent rhabdovirus Ekpoma, Nigeria
 Used clinical sequencing to uncover the origin and evolution of Lassa virus
 Discovered neutralizing monoclonal antibodies that target epitopes on Lassa virus glycoproteins giving potential for immunotherapeutics in Lassa fever.
 Participated in the 1000 genome project for the development of global reference for human genetic variation
 Received the 1st prize in the life sciences and Medicine category at the 6th Nigerian Universities Research and Development fair.
 Trained approximately 1000 young African scientists in the field of Genomics and Bioinformatics between 2014 till date.
 ACEGID was designated as one of the three Africa's regional reference laboratories for genomic sequencing of SARS-CoV-2 and other emerging pathogens.

Academics

The university runs both undergraduate and postgraduate programmes. Undergraduate programmes started at inception in 2005 with three colleges. They were the College of Natural Sciences, College of Management and Social Sciences, College of Humanities.

In the 2012–2013 academic year, the university admitted its first set of M.A., M.Sc., and PhD. students. So far, the university has produced 12 sets of graduates as of November, 2020.

In the 2019/2020 Academic Session, the university changed from the Collegiate system to Faculty system. Also in that academic year, the university added two new Faculties, namely Faculty of Engineering and Faculty of Environmental Sciences. Earlier in 2017/2018, the university commenced the Faculty of Law and Faculty of Basic Medical Sciences.

Faculty of Engineering

This faculty commenced in the 2019–2020 academic session based on the approval of the relevant accrediting bodies.
Programmes include:
 Civil Engineering
 Mechanical Engineering
 Electrical & Electronics Engineering 
 Computer Engineering

Faculty of Environmental Sciences
This faculty commenced in the 2020/2021 academic session and includes programmes such as:
 Architecture
 Urban & Regional Planning
 Quantity Surveying
 Surveying & Geo informatics
 Estate Management 
 Building Technology

Faculty of Law
The faculty of Law offers a five-year law degree (LL.B.) and a four-year direct entry law degree (LL.B.).

Faculty of Basic Medical Sciences

The departments are:
 Nursing Sciences
 Physiotherapy 
 Physiology
 Anatomy 
 Public health 
 Medical laboratory science
The Physiotherapy and Nursing Sciences are Professional Programmes leading to award of Bachelor of Physiotherapy (B.PTH) and Nursing Science Bachelor of Nursing (B.NS) respectively; while the other two programmes lead to award of Bachelor of Science (B.Sc.)..

Faculty of Natural Sciences

The faculty  is home to five departments, namely: Biological Sciences, Chemical Sciences, Computer Sciences, Mathematical Sciences and Physical Sciences.
The programmes lead to the award of Bachelor of Science (B.Sc.) degrees. They are:

 Microbiology
 Applied Biology and Genetics
 Biochemistry
 Industrial Chemistry
 Computer Science
 Industrial Mathematics
 Statistics 
 Physics with Electronics

Faculty of Management Sciences
The Faculty of Management Sciences is one of the three faculties (colleges) which took – off at the inception of the university in the 2005–2006 academic session.
The programmes are:
 Accounting
 Business Administration
 Finance
 Insurance 
 Transport Management
 Marketing

Faculty of Social Sciences

The faculty of Social Sciences offers  four-year degrees (BSc) and  three-year direct entry  degree (BSc). Programmes are:

 Economics
 Mass Communication
 Political Science & Public Administration
 Psychology
 Sociology
 Tourism Studies (which incorporates Hospitality Management)

Faculty of Humanities
Established in 2005. It comprises four accredited departments: 
 English
 History and International Studies
 Theatre Arts and Film Studies
 Religious Studies

College of Postgraduate Studies

The College of Postgraduate Studies commenced in the 2012–2013 academic year, when the university admitted its first set of M.A., M.Sc., and PhD. students. So far, the college continues to award the following postgraduate degrees: 

 PGD 
 MA
 MSc
 MBA
 MMP
 MPhil
 PhD

Notable faculty
 Ahmed Yerima, professor
 Christian Happi, professor

Distinguished alumni
 Kiddominant, music producer
 Debo Macaroni, comedian

References

External links

 

 
2005 establishments in Nigeria
Christian universities and colleges in Nigeria
Education in Ogun State
Educational institutions established in 2005